The Gothic fragment is a type of Gothic fiction characterized by short, atmospheric stories with abrupt beginnings and ends. Widely popular in the late 1700s, gothic fragments are narratives driven by supernatural motifs without explanation. Many were inspired by the works of Nathan Drake, Anna Aikin, and John Aikin.

Definition and analysis 
The Gothic fragment is a type of short Gothic fiction popular in the late 1700s, perhaps approaching the popularity of the Gothic novels of the time. Unlike the Gothic tale, fragments focus mostly on atmosphere instead of plot, and they are written mostly to astonish the reader rather than provide a moral conclusion. While some fragments attempt to explain supernatural elements of their stories, most do not, and fragments typically start abruptly and end without resolution. In this way, Gothic fragments are largely dissimilar from Gothic novels. Although their beginnings and endings are abrupt, they are not incomplete narratives.

Many fragments were published in literary magazines like the Lady's Magazine and the Lady's Monthly Museum. Several are inspired by "Sir Bertrand: A Fragment" (in Miscellaneous Pieces in Prose, 1773) and "Montmorenci, a Fragment" (by Nathan Drake, 1790). While distinctions between Gothic tales and fragments are not entirely well-defined – some stories, like "Fitzalan" (1797), tend to belong in both categories – most fragments are distinctively fragmentary.

Examples 
 "Sir Bertrand: A Fragment" – the first Gothic fragment, written by Anna and/or John Aikin (1773)
 "A Fragment. In the Manner of the Old Romances" – story inspired by "Sir Bertrand: A Fragment" by Mary Hays (1789)
 "Story of Sir Gawen" – story by Nathan Drake (1790)
 "The Two Knights. A Fragment" – story inspired by "Sir Bertrand: A Fragment" by W. G. (1795)
 "Lothaire: A Legend" – story by Harriet Lee
 "Sir Edmund, a Gothic Fragment" – story by "Fredericsberg Germanicus" (1796) 
 "Montmorenci, a Fragment" – story by Nathan Drake (1798)
 "Raymond; a Fragment" – story inspired by "Sir Edmund, a Gothic Fragment" by the pseudonymous "Juvenis" (1799)

Notes and references

Notes

Citations

Works cited

 
 
 
 
 
 

Gothic short stories